Sendelingsdrift is a border post between Namibia and South Africa in the Richtersveld. A ferry carries traffic across the Orange River at 150 rands per vehicle. The post is usually open from 8:00 AM to 4:00 PM. It also serves as an entrance to the ǀAi-ǀAis/Richtersveld Transfrontier Park, formerly known as Richtersveld National Park. Cellphone reception is limited in the area.

Borders of Namibia
Borders of South Africa

This boarder post has been closed since 2020